Samson is a city in Geneva County, Alabama, United States. It is part of the Dothan, Alabama Metropolitan Statistical Area. At the 2020 census the population was 1,874, down from 1,940 in 2010. Samson incorporated in 1905 (according to the 1910 U.S. Census), although other sources cited 1906.

Geography
Samson is located at  (31.112574, -86.047865).

Demographics

2000 census
At the 2000 census there were 2,071 people, 894 households, and 575 families living in the city. The racial makeup of the city was 77.11% White, 20.42% Black or African American, 0.97% Native American, 0.63% from other races, and 0.87% from two or more races. 2.46% of the population were Hispanic or Latino of any race.
Of the 894 households 28.6% had children under the age of 18 living with them, 44.4% were married couples living together, 16.8% had a female householder with no husband present, and 35.6% were non-families. 33.3% of households were one person and 16.1% were one person aged 65 or older. The average household size was 2.32 and the average family size was 2.92.

The age distribution was 25.5% under the age of 18, 7.5% from 18 to 24, 24.8% from 25 to 44, 24.3% from 45 to 64, and 17.9% 65 or older. The median age was 38 years. For every 100 females, there were 86.9 males. For every 100 females age 18 and over, there were 80.5 males.

The median household income was $18,594 and the median family income  was $25,188. Males had a median income of $25,767 versus $16,719 for females. The per capita income for the city was $12,834. About 29.2% of families and 33.8% of the population were below the poverty line, including 51.1% of those under age 18 and 32.0% of those age 65 or over.

2010 census

At the 2010 census there were 1,940 people, 814 households, and 513 families living in the city. The racial makeup of the city was 73.3% White, 17.9% Black or African American, 1.1% Native American, 5.2% from other races, and 2.1% from two or more races. 8.3% of the population were Hispanic or Latino of any race.
Of the 814 households 25.6% had children under the age of 18 living with them, 36.2% were married couples living together, 20.1% had a female householder with no husband present, and 37.0% were non-families. 32.3% of households were one person and 13.6% were one person aged 65 or older. The average household size was 2.38 and the average family size was 3.05.

The age distribution was 24.6% under the age of 18, 8.6% from 18 to 24, 24.8% from 25 to 44, 25.6% from 45 to 64, and 16.4% 65 or older. The median age was 38.1 years. For every 100 females, there were 90.0 males. For every 100 females age 18 and over, there were 90.7 males.

The median household income was $18,768 and the median family income  was $25,060. Males had a median income of $29,167 versus $19,682 for females. The per capita income for the city was $11,606. About 31.6% of families and 32.5% of the population were below the poverty line, including 44.7% of those under age 18 and 19.4% of those age 65 or over.

2020 census

As of the 2020 United States census, there were 1,874 people, 763 households, and 434 families residing in the city.

Notable people
Samson was home to guitarist Roy Brooks from 1971 to 1983. 
 Terry Owens, played 11 years for the San Diego Chargers professional football. Graduated from Samson High School in 1962.
James "J.T." Thomas, Jr., winner of Survivor: Tocantins, is from Samson.
Bill Yates, cartoonist, was born in Samson.

2009 shooting

On March 10, 2009, in the Alabama towns of Kinston, Samson and Geneva, Michael McLendon killed ten people and wounded six others in a shooting rampage before committing suicide. In response, troops from nearby Fort Rucker were deployed to the streets of Samson where they manned barricades and guarded a makeshift morgue. This was later determined to be in violation of the Posse Comitatus Act, which prohibits federal troops from performing law enforcement actions.

References 

Cities in Alabama
Cities in Geneva County, Alabama
Dothan metropolitan area, Alabama